Odessadale is an unincorporated community in Meriwether County, in the U.S. state of Georgia.

History
Variant names were "Odessa" and "Xerxes". A post office called Odessadale was established in 1891, and remained in operation until 1953. The present name is after Odessa Jane Thompson, the daughter of a pioneer citizen.

The Georgia General Assembly incorporated the town as Odessadale in 1905. The town's municipal charter was repealed in 1995.

References

Former municipalities in Georgia (U.S. state)
Unincorporated communities in Meriwether County, Georgia
Populated places disestablished in 1995
Unincorporated communities in Georgia (U.S. state)